John Russ (October 29, 1767 – June 22, 1833) was a United States representative from Connecticut.

Born in the small Massachusetts town of Ipswich, Russ completed his preparatory studies and then moved to Hartford, Connecticut where he engaged in mercantile pursuits.

Russ was elected to the Sixteenth and Seventeenth Congresses (March 4, 1819 - March 3, 1823). He was not a candidate for reelection in 1823 and was an unsuccessful candidate for election in 1823 to the Connecticut State House of Representatives. He was elected to the State house of representatives in 1824 and then elected as a judge of the Hartford Probate Court in 1824 and served until 1830.

He died in Hartford, aged 65, and was buried in the Old North Cemetery.

References

1767 births
1833 deaths
People from Ipswich, Massachusetts
Politicians from Hartford, Connecticut
Members of the Connecticut House of Representatives
Democratic-Republican Party members of the United States House of Representatives from Connecticut